Television in Romania started in August 1955. State television started to broadcast on December 31, 1956. The second television channel followed in 1968, but between 1985 and 1990, there was only one Romanian channel before the return of the second channel. Private broadcasters arrived in December 1991, with SOTI which was the first private nationwide television station in Central and Eastern Europe. Romania has the highest penetration rates for pay television in the world, with over 98% of all households watching television through cable or satellite.

Television market 
Romanian market is dominated by two large groups: Central European Media Enterprises Ltd.  and Intact Media Group, with PRO TV and Antena 1 as main channels and Kanal D also gain audience starting 2014 as the third channel. There are over 50 channels running ads, as of 2015 television being the best type of advertising in Romania. Over 80% of revenue advertising is earned by three players: 35% (48% GRP) PRO TV Group, 26% ANTENA TV Group, 10% Kanal D and 29% (15% GRP) rest of the channels.

Terrestrial television 
Romania is the only EU state that didn't end analogue broadcasting because of low interest in terrestrial television. Tests began DVB-T in 2005 with two channels in Bucharest and one in Sibiu using MPEG 2 for SD Channels and MPEG 4 for HD Channels. It broadcast public channels (including one in HD) and a for a limited time a few commercial television channel (general, news and music) until September 2016.
On July 23, 2013 PRO TV, the largest television channel, changed from free to pay television.

ANCOM cancelled the auction for multiplexes in 2011, and postponed the switching-off to June 17, 2015.
Since June 2015 only TVR 1 continue to broadcast analogue until 31 December 2016, later again postponed until 31 December 2018. The rest of analogue broadcasts were shut down.

The absence and lack of implementation of DVB-T in Romania is somehow controversial, as many people are suspecting that this delay and the adoption of DVB-T2 is forced just to sustain the interest of cable and DTH providers, also the lack of interest of the must carry broadcasters in providing channels in terrestrial is very criticized, however the main DVB-T operator in Romania is SNR, which is said to be responsible for this.

In September 2016, Romania turned off DVB-T broadcasts which were experimental, and shifted on DVB-T2 technology.
Criticism has appeared in the press about delays, suggesting that this will be a reason for the 20% of households who were receiving free terrestrial television to migrate towards cable and satellite operators. TVR remained the only broadcaster on DVB-T2. It is sent in Free To Air, as it is a public station.

On 23 November 2022, TVR, the only broadcaster on terrestrial in Romania, removed the HD broadcasts for TVR-1 and TVR-2 on DVB-T2, leaving terrestrial broadcasting only with the SD broadcasts of TVR. TVR 1 HD and TVR 2 HD will be available solely on Satellite, Cable and IPTV. This happened mainly because of low demand of the terrestrial services, and to make room for the newly relaunched TVR Cultural.

Cable television 
Romania has a high penetration rates for cable television in Europe, with over 79% of all households watching television through a CATV network in 2007. The market is extremely dynamic, and dominated by two giant companies – Romanian-based RCS&RDS (DIGI) and U.K.-based (UPC). Both offer internet broadband and fixed telephony (VOIP), while DIGI offer also mobile telephony services. The national CATV network is being improved, and most households are being migrated towards digital cable solutions.

The reasons for this appeal started in the early 1990s. After the fall of the communist regime, in 1989, there was only one state-owned TVR 1, a second channel, TVR 2 being reopen in February 1990. Nationwide private TV channels were slow to appear, because of lack of experience and high start-up costs (most startups were radio stations or newspapers). Thus, for the first three years, over the air, one would get one or two state channels and one or two local, amateurish private channels, broadcasting only a few hours a day. Atlantic Television, headed by Robin Edwards and Peter Thomas, which included US broadcaster Capital Cities/ABC and Canadian broadcaster CanWest International, partnered with TVR, the state broadcaster, to form Canalul 2 Television. Following a move whereby CanWest became the main shareholder and caused upset with TVR, the arrangements fell to pieces, to the consternation of Romanian reformers many of whom believed that Canwest's incompetence set Romanian civil society back ten years. Edwards later sued CanWest International in Barbados and won the case, before suing in Canada where CanWest settled out of court. Both Edwards and Thomas worked successfully at high level in the country for many years, Edwards in a political capacity whilst founding the 100,000 weekly circulation Business Week, Thomas in agriculture. After this many cable[4] companies appeared and thrived, providing 15–20 foreign channels, taken freely from the satellite, for a very low price (at the time US$2 or less), offering high-quality news, entertainment and especially movies or cartoons (one of the ways cable companies advertised was the availability of a cartoon channel, Cartoon Network, appealing to children, which in turn would appeal to their parents). Channels which was broadcast in 1990s are: general channels from France, Germany, Italy, Eurosport (start in Romanian in 1997), Duna, DSF, VIVA, VIVA Zwei, MTV, MCM, CMT Europe, Cartoon Network, TNT, Discovery Channel (subtitles in Romanian since 1997), TLC, Animal Planet (subtitles in Romanian), Sky News, Sky One, FilmNet, TV1000, NBC Europe, Fox Kids (in Romanian). The first two companies to provide CATV were Multicanal in Bucharest and Timiş Cablu in Timișoara, both out of business today. Many small, startup firms gradually grew, and coverage increased (coverage wars were frequent in the early period, with many cable boxes smashed, and new cable networks offering "half off for twice the channels" and immediately wiring the building for any willing persons).

However, this period soon ended, with consolidation around 1995–96. Some large companies emerged: Kappa and RCS in Bucharest, Astral in Cluj, UPC in Timișoara, TourImex in Râmnicu Vâlcea. This consolidation came with gentlemen's agreements over areas of control and pricing, with claims of monopoly abounding. This process of consolidation was completed around 2005–06, when only two big suppliers of cable remained: UPC and RCS&RDS (DIGI). Internet over coaxial cable has been available since around 2000, and IP telephony (over the CATV infrastructure) since the deregulation of the market in 2003. As of 2016, cable TV is available in most of the country, including most rural areas (where nearly 50% of the population live). Satellite digital TV appeared in 2004, providing coverage for the rest of the country, with both RCS&RDS and UPC having a stake in these companies. However, beside RCS&RDS and UPC, there are many other smaller CATV providers in Romania, operating locally or regionally. In early 2010s most of them began providing Internet access, to make their offers more attractive and increase their appeal to their customers already subscribed to CATV service. Also many of them began providing digital cable television, although analogue cable TV is their basic offer.

Cable TV is very cheap for all standards, the standard or basic service, offering about 100–140 channels, is around 24–39 RON/month including VAT (about €5–€9), depending by the provider as DIGI offer almost all channels in one pack at 28 RON. Premium HBO and Cinemax cost no more than 14–20 RON/month (around €3–€4). Cable television is also attractive because today, all CATV operators in Romania are also providing Internet access at various speeds (ranging from 50 MBPS to 1000 MBPS – depending on the provider and region), in many cases subscribers are contracting an Internet and TV package, at a fairly low price (as low as 60–70 lei/month). Internet access is, in many cases, granted by cable TV operators, as it was cheaper to implement it over the existent CATV networks in some cases.
As of 2018 more than half of households in Romania is subscribed to cable television.

Satellite television 

After cable, satellite subscriptions hold second place, and are mainly popular in rural areas, where cable television and optical fiber networks were not widely available in the second half of the 2000s. The main operators are: Telekom TV, DIGI, Focus Sat operated by UPC Romania (the first DTH platform in Romania), FreeSat, and Orange operated by Orange Romania. Most of providers offer a small number of HD channels (10 channels), except Focus Sat (20 channels) and Orange, which is mainly dedicated to HD broadcasting with 50 channels. Focus Sat and FreeSat are prepaid services and can be also used with a CAM and a smart card. Defunct DTH Platforms are: Boom TV and AKTA Satelit, which were acquired by Romtelecom, now Telekom Romania.

IPTV 

IP television in Romania is not very popular. Romtelecom (now Telekom) started to upgrade slowly ADSL network with VDSL very lately in 2008, and launched IPTV on December 8, 2009. It is popular in business (companies, corporations etc.) sector rather than consumer. It is provided by Telekom (formerly Romtelecom), INES. RCS RDS tried unsuccessfully to implement IPTV being available to a limited number of subscribers since 2010.

Internet television channel
Antena Monden
Bairam TV
Comedy Play

Cook&Play
Dibi Tv 
Disco Mix
Info TV România
Mireasa (internet tv channel)
Mireasa+
Partymania (internet tv channel)
Pro TV News
Tele 7 ABC
TSTV (România)

List of channels 
The following is a list of television channels broadcast in Romania.

A&E Networks UK
Channels operated by A&E Networks UK, a joint-venture with Sky plc:
 Crime & Investigation
 History

AMC Networks International 
 AMC 
 CBS Reality (a joint-venture with CBS Studios International)
 Extreme Sports
 Filmcafe 
 JimJam
 Minimax 
 Outdoor channel   (joint-venture)
 Sundance TV
 TV Paprika

Antenna Group
 AXN 
 AXN White
 AXN Black 
 AXN Spin 
 Kiss TV
 Magic TV 
 Rock TV
 Viasat Explore 
 Viasat History 
 Viasat Nature 
 Epic Drama
 TV1000

BBC Worldwide
 BBC Earth 
 BBC First''
 BBC World News

Central European Media Enterprises
 Pro TV 
 Acasă 
 Pro Cinema
 Acasă Gold
 Pro Arena 
 Pro TV Internațional

Centrul Naţional Media
 Favorit TV
 Național TV
 Național 24 Plus

Clever Media Broadcasting
 Agro TV
 Cinemaraton
 Medika TV
 Prima Comedy 
 Prima Sport 1
 Prima Sport 2
 Prima Sport 3
 Prima Sport 4
 Prima Sport 5
 Prima TV
 Prima 4K
 Prima News
 Profit News

DIGI
Digi24 
Digi Sport 1 
Digi Sport 2 
Digi Sport 3 
Digi Sport 4 
Digi World 
Digi Life 
Digi Animal World 
Digi 4K
Film Now
U TV 
Hora TV
Music Channel (50%)
HIT Music Channel (50%)

Warner Bros. Discovery
 HBO 
 HBO 2 
 HBO 3 
 Cinemax 
 Cinemax 2 
 Animal Planet
 Discovery Channel
 Discovery HD Showcase
 Discovery Science
 DTX
 Eurosport 1
 Eurosport 2
 Eurosport 4K
 Fine Living
 Food Network (joint-venture with Tribune Media)
 HGTV
 Investigation Discovery
 TLC
 Travel Channel

Disney Channels Worldwide EMEA
 BabyTV
 Disney Channel 
 Disney Junior 
 Nat Geo People
 National Geographic 
 National Geographic Wild

Intact Media Group
 Antena 1 
 Antena 3 CNN 
 Antena Stars 
 Antena Internațional 
 Happy 
 ZU TV

ISG Media
 Bollywood Classic
 Bollywood Film
 Bollywood TV

Kino Polska
 360 TuneBox
 DocuBox
 Erox
 Eroxxx
 FashionBox
 Fast&FunBox
 Filmbox
 Filmbox Arthouse
 Filmbox Extra (HD)
 Filmbox Family
 Filmbox Plus
 Filmbox Premium
 FightBox
 FunBox UHD
 GameToon
 Timeless Drama Channel

Mooz TV
 Mooz Dance
 Mooz Hits
 Mooz HD 
 Mooz RO
 Sport Extra

NBCUniversal International Networks
 Diva
 E! 
 CNBC

Orange
 Orange Sport 1 
 Orange Sport 2 
 Orange Sport 3 
 Orange Sport 4

Tematic Media
 Duck TV
 The Fishing & Hunting Channel
 Shorts TV

Turner Broadcasting System Europe
 Boomerang 
 Cartoon Network 
 TNT 
 CNN International 
 Euronews (25%) (in English)

TVR
 TVR 1
 TVR 2
 TVR 3
 TVR Info
 TVR Cultural
 TVR Internațional

Paramount Networks EMEAA

 Paramount Channel
 Comedy Central 
Channels operated by Nickelodeon UK, a joint venture with Sky plc:
 Nickelodeon 
 Nick Jr. 
 Nicktoons
Channels wholly operated by Viacom International Media Networks Europe:
 TeenNick
 MTV
 VH1
 MTV Hits 
 MTV Rocks 
 Club MTV
 MTV 80s
 MTV 90s
 MTV Live HD

Main single-channel broadcasters
 Kanal D 
 România TV
 Realitatea Plus
 B1

Other channels
 Da Vinci Kids 
 Trinitas TV
 Speranta TV
 Alfa Omega TV
 Credo TV
 Travel Mix
 Nasul TV
 Top Shop TV
 Telestar
 Etno TV (HD)
 Taraf TV (HD)
 Inedit TV
 Hora TV
 Estrada
 IDA TV
 TV Maria
 Zoom TV România
 Aleph News
 Aleph Business
 Smart TV

International channels
 TV5Monde (partially with subtitles)
 Arte
 Duna
 Deutsche Welle 
 RTL
 Super RTL
 Sat.1
 ProSieben
 Rai 1
 Rai 3
 TVE Internacional
 France 24
 Bloomberg
 Al Jazeera 
 Russia Today
 Sky News
 CGTN
 KBS World
 Mezzo
 Fashion TV 
 Nautical Channel 
 Auto Motor Sports 
 Motorvision 
 Trace Urban 
 Trace Tropical 
 Trace Stars Sports 
 Balkanika TV
 Myzen.tv

Most viewed channels 

Most viewed channels, January 2023

Given Romania's extensive cable coverage, many channels receive considerable viewing shares. Pro TV is the most viewed channel. Ratings data is measured by TNS-AGB International (2005–2007) and GfK Romania (2008–2011) on behalf of ARMADATA S.R.L.

See also 
 Media of Romania
 List of Romanian language television channels
 List of television stations in Romania
 List of Romanian television series

References